Re Recher's Will Trusts [1972] Ch 526 is an English trusts law case, concerning the policy of the beneficiary principle and unincorporated associations.

Facts
The testator's will on 23 May 1957 gave some of the residual estate to the Anti-Vivisection Society, at 76 Victoria St, SW1, which was construed as being 'the London and Provincial Anti-Vivisection Society'. But this had wound up on 1 January 1957 and amalgamated into The National Anti-Vivisection Society of 27 Palace Street, SW1. Neither were charities. She died in 1962.

Judgment
Brightman J held that the gifts had failed. They could not be construed as one to the new National Society, only the previous one. If it had still existed, it would have been a gift to the members beneficially, subject to their association contract. Yet because it had ended, nor "saving words", words of trust, there was no such gift to the members. He asked whether the gift would have been valid if the unincorporated association had indeed existed at all at the time. The rules of the society did not purport to create any trusts. He said:

See also

English trusts law

Notes

References

English trusts case law
High Court of Justice cases
1972 in British law
1972 in case law